Live from the Road is the first live album released by American rock band Chevelle. It was released in 2003 on Epic Records. It was recorded on Ozzfest 2003, where Chevelle served as a mainstage act, and accompanies the concert DVD Live from the Norva, released October 13. Live from the Road features songs from Chevelle's first two albums, 1999's Point #1 and 2002's Platinum-selling Wonder What's Next.

Track listing

Credits
 Barnaby Draper – photography
 Ben Goldman – A&R
 Chevelle – producer
 Dave Pinsky – engineer, mixing, producer
 Farra Mathews – A&R
 Thom Cadley – mixing

References

2003 live albums
Chevelle (band) albums
Epic Records live albums